Hypotrachyna andensis is a species of foliose lichen in the family Parmeliaceae. It is known to occur in the Neotropics and in Papua New Guinea.

References

andensis
Lichen species
Lichens described in 1975
Lichens of South America
Lichens of New Guinea
Taxa named by Mason Hale